, also known as Maihime Τερψιχόρα in Greek, is a Japanese manga written and illustrated by Ryoko Yamagishi. The manga was awarded the grand prize for the 11th Tezuka Osamu Cultural Prize in 2007. Media Factory published the 10 tankōbon volumes of the manga between June 23, 2001, and January 23, 2007.

Ryoko Yamagishi also wrote a sequel, titled . Media Factory has released the first tankōbon volume on July 23, 2008. Media Factory released the fourth volume of the manga on July 23, 2010. The second volume of Terpsichora Part 2 was ranked 10th on the Tohan charts between 24th and 30 March 2009. The fourth volume of Terpsichora Part 2 was ranked 18th and 19th on the Tohan charts between July 19, 2010, and August 1, 2010.

References

External links
 

2001 manga
Books about ballet
Coming-of-age anime and manga
Media Factory manga
Kadokawa Dwango franchises
Shōjo manga
Winner of Tezuka Osamu Cultural Prize (Grand Prize)
Dance in anime and manga